Heliocheilus albipunctella, the millet head miner moth, is a moth in the family Noctuidae. It is found in the Sahelian region of West Africa.

Life cycle
The flight period of the adult moth coincides with the peak of millet panicle emergence and flowering, which is towards the end of August in southern Niger.

After hatching, caterpillars feed and complete their larval development within the panicle. During this period the seed head also grows and develops, passing from emergence through flowering to grain-filling and maturity. The early larval instars eat into individual florets, whilst larger larvae consume peduncles, thereby killing the developing grains, and creating mines around the rachis which are evident as characteristic raised tracks on the panicle surface. Full-grown caterpillars are pink. When mature they drop to the ground, where they burrow into the soil to pupate, usually close to the host plant.

References

Heliocheilus
Moths of Africa
Agricultural pest insects
Insect pests of millets